The acronym ICSH can stand for:
 Irish Council for Social Housing
 Interstitial Cell Stimulating Hormone